The  Religious Institute, Inc. is a progressive American multi-faith organization dedicated to advocating for sexual health, education, and justice in faith communities and society. It was co-founded in 2001 by Debra Haffner, a Unitarian Universalist minister and sexologist, and Larry Greenfield, an American Baptist minister and theologian.

The Religious Institute's initial purpose is "to change the way America understands the relationship of sexuality and religion". Among its objectives are building a network of clergy and other religious leaders who are dedicated to sexual justice, promoting sexuality education in faith communities, and educating policymakers and the general public about a progressive religious view of sexuality.

History
At its inception, the Religious Institute was a program of Christian Community, Inc. That organization became defunct in February 2012. In March 2012, the Religious Institute incorporated as an independent organization, Religious Institute, Inc, and received IRS recognition as a non-profit educational organization shortly thereafter.

Issues
The Religious Institute addresses a variety of sexual and reproductive justice concerns through advocacy, education, and development of resources as well as through partnerships with clergy and congregations, national religious organizations, and sexual and reproductive health organization.

Services

Technical assistance
The Religious Institute staff work with clergy, congregations, and denominational bodies on a one-time, short-term, or long-term basis to address sexuality issues. Staff can help choose or plan curricula, develop safe congregation policies, identify local consultants or referral sources, and respond to difficult situations and circumstances around a sexuality issue.

Training workshops and speaking engagements
The Religious Institute provides keynote speakers and workshop leaders for congregations as well as regional and national meetings on sexuality, spirituality, and religion; sexuality education for youth, parents, and adults; building sexually healthy faith communities; and other sexuality and religion topics.

Media
Religious Institute staff assist the media in identifying spokespeople from various denominations to speak on sexual justice issues.

Clearinghouse
The Religious Institute's clearinghouse includes information on sexuality and religion, including practices, resources, trends, and current controversies.

References

External links
 
 Religious Declaration on Sexual Morality, Justice, and Healing

Abortion-rights religious organizations
LGBT religious organizations
Sexuality and religion
Sexual ethics
Religious organizations established in 2001
Organizations based in Connecticut
Bridgeport, Connecticut